Mario Manuel de Oliveira (born 29 November 1994), better known as just Ito, is an Angolan footballer who plays as a defender.

References 

 

1994 births
Living people
Association football defenders
Angolan footballers
Angola international footballers
Atlético Petróleos de Luanda players
C.R.D. Libolo players
G.D. Interclube players
Progresso Associação do Sambizanga players